Placidochromis polli is a species of cichlid endemic to the southern portions of Lake Malawi where it prefers areas with muddy or sandy substrates at depths of greater than .  This species can reach a length of  SL.

Etymology
Its specific name honours the Belgian ichthyologist Max Poll (1908-1991).

References

polli
Fish of Lake Malawi
Fish of Malawi
Fish described in 1973
Taxa named by Warren E. Burgess
Taxa named by Herbert R. Axelrod
Taxonomy articles created by Polbot